Aryan Tari (Persian: آرین طاری; born 4 June 1999) is a Norwegian chess grandmaster of Iranian origin . Tari was Norwegian champion in 2015 and 2019 and won the World Junior Chess Championship in 2017.  he is the second-highest ranked player from Norway by FIDE, after only current World Champion Magnus Carlsen.

Chess career

2012-2014
Tari has played chess since the age of five. He won the Junior section of the Norwegian Chess Championship in 2012, qualifying him for the championship section in 2013. At the Open Norwegian Championship in Fagernes in March 2013, Tari finished in seventh place and scored a norm for the title of Grandmaster, the second youngest Norwegian player ever to have done so at the time..Following an eighth-place finish in 2013 and a second-place finish in 2014.

2015-2018
Tari won the 2015 Norwegian Chess Championship, At age 16 he was the third youngest player to achieve this feat, after Simen Agdestein and Magnus Carlsen, who won at age 15.
Tari secured his second grandmaster norm over nine rounds at the 2015 European Team Chess Championship in Reykjavik where he played Norway's third board and scored six points. A special FIDE clause for the continental team championships regards this as a 20-game norm, which together with his norm from Fagernes and rating over 2500 is sufficient for the grandmaster title; this title was awarded at the FIDE congress in March 2016. He was Norway's 12th player to be awarded this title.

At the European Individual Chess Championship, played 12–23 May 2016, Tari achieved his best result in his career with 7½/11 (+5–1=5). This gave him a twenty-second-place finish and earned him a berth in the Chess World Cup 2017 in Tbilisi, where he was eliminated in the second round after losing 1½-½ to Aleksandr Lenderman.

2019-2022
In the 2019/2020 season, he played as a foreigner for the Czech Extraliga team SLAVIA Kroměříž. Tari won the Norwegian Chess Championship 2019 for the second time ever. In 2020/2021 Spanish CECLUB championship, he played for Xadrez Ourense. Tari played in the Norway Chess 2022 and defeated Magnus Carlsen for the first time, later he represented Norway in the 44th Chess Olympiad which was held in Chennai, India.

Personal life
Tari was born in Stavanger to Faranak and Siamak Tari, both from Iran who migrated to Norway before his birth. Tari and Magnus Carlsen are also very close friends.

References

External links

 
 
 

1999 births
Living people
Chess grandmasters
Norwegian chess players
Norwegian people of Iranian descent
People from Stavanger
World Junior Chess Champions